The secretary of energy (Filipino: Kalihim ng Enerhiya) is the member of the Cabinet of the Philippines in charge of the Department of Energy.

List of secretaries of energy

References

External links
DOE website

 
Energy
Philippines